Unna is a town that is the seat of the Unna district.

Unna may also refer to:

People 
Henry of Unna, proctor of the University of Paris in the 14th century
Jacob Unna (1800–1881), born in Hamburg, of German Jewish descent
Moshe Unna (1902–1989), Israeli politician
Paul Gerson Unna (1850–1929), German physician
Warren Unna (1923–2017), American journalist

Other uses 
Unna (district), a  district in the state of North Rhine-Westphalia, Germany
Unna, a captive orca
Unna, a long scarf worn by South Asians
Unna boot, a special gauze bandage
Unna, a word in Indigenous Australian lexicology meaning "ain't it?"